Sycamore is the common name for several different species of trees.

Sycamore may also refer to:

Music 
 "The Sycamore", a 1904 ragtime composition by Scott Joplin
 "Sycamore Trees", a song featured on the Twin Peaks: Fire Walk with Me film soundtrack
 "The Sycamore Tree" (song), a 2000 song by Paul Brandt
 Sycamore Smith, American musician
 Sykamore, Canadian country music artist
 sycamore (song), a 2020 song from The White Buffalo (musician)

Places in the United States

Communities
 Sycamore, Alabama
 Sycamore, California
 Sycamore, former name of Herndon, California
 Sycamore, Delaware
 Sycamore, Georgia
 Sycamore, Illinois
 Sycamore, Indiana
 Sycamore, Kansas
 Sycamore, Kentucky
 Sycamore, Missouri
 Sycamore, Ohio
 Sycamore, Delaware County, Oklahoma
 Sycamore, Sequoyah County, Oklahoma
 Sycamore, South Carolina
 Sycamore, Texas, a ghost town
 Sycamore, Calhoun County, West Virginia
 Sycamore, Logan County, West Virginia
 Sycamore Township (disambiguation)

Landforms
 Sycamore Canyon
 Sycamore Island (Pennsylvania)
 Sycamore Shoals, on the Watauga River near Elizabethton, Tennessee

Schools
 Sycamore High School (Sycamore, Illinois)
 Sycamore High School (Cincinnati, Ohio)
 Sycamore School, Indianapolis, Indiana

Transport
 , a U.S. Coast Guard river tender
 , a U.S. Coast Guard sea going buoy tender
 MV Sycamore, a Royal Australian Navy vessel
 Bristol Sycamore, an early helicopter design
 Chayair Sycamore, South African autogyro

Other uses 
 Sycamore (moth), a species of moth
 Sycamore Networks, an optical transmission hardware manufacturer
 Sycamore processor, a quantum processor created by Google
 Indiana State Sycamores, the intercollegiate athletic program of Indiana State University